Dimethyl carbonate (DMC) is an organic compound with the formula OC(OCH3)2.  It is a colourless, flammable liquid.  It is classified as a carbonate ester. This compound has found use as a methylating agent and more recently as a solvent that is exempt from the restrictions placed on most volatile organic compounds (VOCs) in the US. Dimethyl carbonate is often considered to be a green reagent.

Production
World production in 1997 was estimated at 1000 barrels a day. Production of dimethyl carbonate worldwide is limited to Asia, the Middle East, and Europe.

Dimethyl carbonate is traditionally prepared by the reaction of phosgene and methanol.   Methyl chloroformate is produced as an intermediate:
 COCl2 + CH3OH → CH3OCOCl + HCl
 CH3OCOCl + CH3OH → CH3OCO2CH3 + HCl

This synthesis route has been largely replaced by oxidative carbonylation. In this process, carbon monoxide and an oxidizer provide the equivalent of CO2+: 
 CO  +  1/2 O2 + 2 CH3OH → (CH3O)2CO + H2O

It can also be produced industrially by a transesterification of ethylene carbonate or propylene carbonate and methanol, which also affords respectively ethylene glycol or propylene glycol.

Reactions and potential applications

Methylating agent
Dimethyl carbonate methylates anilines, carboxylic acids, and phenols, albeit usually slowly. Sometimes these reactions require the use of an autoclave.

Dimethyl carbonate's main benefit over other methylating reagents such as iodomethane and dimethyl sulfate is its low toxicity.  Additionally, it is biodegradable. Unfortunately, it is a relatively weak methylating agent compared to these traditional reagents.

Solvent
In the US, dimethyl carbonate was exempted under the definition of volatile organic compounds (VOCs) by the U.S. EPA in 2009.  Due to its classification as VOC exempt, dimethyl carbonate has grown in popularity and applications as a replacement for methyl ethyl ketone (MEK) and parachlorobenzotrifluoride, as well as tert-butyl acetate until it too was exempted.  Dimethyl carbonate has an ester- or alcohol-like odor, which is more favorable to users than most hydrocarbon solvents it replaces.  Dimethyl carbonate has an evaporation rate of 3.22 (butyl acetate = 1.0), which slightly slower than MEK (3.8) and ethyl acetate (4.1), and faster than toluene (2.0) and isopropanol (1.7).  Dimethyl carbonate has solubility profile similar to common glycol ethers, meaning dimethyl carbonate can dissolve most common coating resins except perhaps rubber based resins.  Hildebrand solubility parameter is 20.3 MPa and Hansen solubility parameters are:  dispersion = 15.5, polar = 3.9, H bonding = 9.7.  Dimethyl carbonate is partially soluble in water up to 13%, however it is hydrolyzed in water-based systems over time to methanol and CO2 unless properly buffered.
Dimethyl carbonate can freeze at same temperatures as water, it can be thawed out with no loss of properties to itself or coatings based on dimethyl carbonate.

Intermediate in polycarbonate synthesis
A large captive use of dimethyl carbonate is for the production of diphenyl carbonate through transesterification with phenol. Diphenyl carbonate is a widely used raw material for the synthesis of bisphenol-A-polycarbonate in a melt polycondensation process, the resulting product being recyclable by reversing the process and transesterifying the polycarbonate with phenol to yield diphenyl carbonate and bisphenol A.

Alternative fuel additive
There is also interest in using this compound as a fuel oxygenate additive.

Safety
DMC is a flammable liquid with a flash point of 17 °C (63 °F), which limits its use in consumer and indoor applications. DMC is still safer than acetone, methyl acetate and methyl ethyl ketone from a flammability point of view.  DMC has a recommended exposure limit (REL) limit of 100 ppm by inhalation over an 8-hour work day, which is similar to that of a number of common industrial solvents (toluene, methyl ethyl ketone).  Workers should wear protective organic vapor respirators when using DMC indoors or in other conditions where concentrations exceed the REL.  DMC is metabolized by the body to methanol and carbon dioxide, so accidental ingestion should be treated in the same manner as methanol poisoning.

See also
Dimethyl dicarbonate

References

Methylating agents
Carbonate esters
Methyl esters